Manuel Alonso Corral (1934 – 15 July 2011), known by his religious name as Isidoro María and by his papal name as Peter II, was the Pope of the Palmarian Christian Church, a mysticalist group not recognised by the Catholic Church, from 2005 to 2011.

Corral was a lawyer, but he left his legal practice to join Clemente Domínguez y Gómez, who founded the Carmelite Order of the Holy Face in 1975.

Corral was ordained priest and bishop by Catholic Archbishop Pierre Martin Ngô Đình Thục in 1976 along with Domínguez and three others (these three others had already been Catholic priests for many years). Archbishop Thuc and the five new bishops were excommunicated by Pope Paul VI for consecrating bishops without the Holy See's approval. Thuc recanted and repudiated his consecrations for the Palmar-based Carmelite Order of the Holy Face. He asked Pope Paul VI to be forgiven and was absolved of all ecclesial penalties in 1976, until 1981 when he was again excommunicated by Pope John Paul II for illicit consecrations.

In 1978, Domínguez claimed that Jesus Christ created him pope in 1978 in a mystical vision and transformed the Order into the Palmarian Catholic Church. Domínguez, now called Pope Gregory XVII, named Corral Cardinal Secretary of State of their church and named him his successor in 2000. This appointment – instead of leaving this decision to a Palmarian College of Cardinals – contributed to a rift in the church.

Upon Domínguez's death in 2005, Corral succeeded him as Pope Peter II and headed the Palmarian Christian Church until his own death in 2011. After his death, Corral was canonised on 17 July 2011 by his successor, Gregory XVIII, and has subsequently been referred to by adherents of his church as "Pope Saint Peter II the Great".

Film
In the 1986 Spanish film Manuel y Clemente, Manuel is played by Juan Jesús Valverde.

References

 

2011 deaths
21st-century antipopes
Bishops of Independent Catholic denominations
People excommunicated by the Catholic Church
Spanish religious leaders
Thục line bishops
1934 births
Antipopes
Conclavism